The Military Service for Security and Intelligence of North Macedonia is an intelligence office within the Ministry of Defence of North Macedonia.

Mission
Planning, analyzing, processing and dissemination of intelligence data in order to protect the territorial integrity, independence and the boarder interests of the Republic of Macedonia in accordance with the Constitution, Law on defence and the national security and defence concept of the Republic of Macedonia
Planning, analyzing, processing and dissemination of intelligence data required to participate in peace support and NATO-led conflict prevention operations
Intelligence support of humanitarian operations and peace support operations in dealing with natural disasters and humanitarian crises.

Tasks

Military intelligence 
Plans, organizes and conducts intelligence support required for the decision making process of the GS of ARM during ARM participation in various operations in Macedonia and abroad; 
Manages Intelligence data to suit the needs of the GS of ARM in preparation, plans and executes  various operations;
Plans, coordinates and synchronizes intelligence operations in subordinate commands and units; 
Plans, organizes and conducts Intelligence preparation of the battle field (IPB) for military and operations other than war in Macedonia and abroad.

Counter intelligence 
Plans, organizes and implements CI measures in MOD and Armed forces;
Detects hostile intelligence capacities for data collection;
Recognizes hostile intelligence capabilities to interfere in hostile influence;
Provides CI operations for force protection.

Security
Recognizes critical physical security points
Coordinates and conducts security examination and control

Staff planning
Plans and decision making process support
Supports the planning process and maintains functional connections with MSSI(Military Sector for Security and Intelligence) in order to provide relevant intelligence data and analysis
Supports the duties and responsibilities in the GS scope of work aimed at supporting the mission
Responsible for planning and execution of intelligence exercises security
Trains subordinates

Organisation

Directors

See also
North Macedonia
  Administration for Security and Counterintelligence (Police Agency)
Intelligence Agency (Civilian Agency)
  Special Forces Battalion
  The Rangers Battalion
  Ceremonial Guard Battalion
   North Macedonia Air Force

Reference list

External links
 MSSI

North Macedonia intelligence agencies
Military intelligence agencies